Rodolfo Dubó Segovia (born September 11, 1953) is a retired football midfielder from Chile, who represented his native country at the 1982 FIFA World Cup, wearing the number six jersey. He played for Club Deportivo Palestino and Universidad de Chile. He played 46 matches for his country scoring 3 goals between 1977 and 1985.

References

External links
 
 Weltfussball profile 

1953 births
Living people
People from Limarí Province
Chilean footballers
Universidad de Chile footballers
Association football midfielders
Chile international footballers
1982 FIFA World Cup players
1979 Copa América players
1983 Copa América players
Club Deportivo Palestino footballers
Chilean football managers
Unión La Calera managers